Bolaji Odofin is a prize-winning Nigerian playwright. A journalist and former magazine publisher, Odofin currently works in the not-for-profit sector.

References

BBC announces winners of International Radio Playwriting Competition
BBC World Drama
Auckland Writer Makuwe shines
Nigerian lady wins BBC playwriting prize
African Perspective on BBC World Service

Year of birth missing (living people)
Living people
Nigerian dramatists and playwrights